Inspector Lohit Sonowal, KC was an Inspector of Commando Battalion of Assam Police who was posthumously awarded India's second highest peace time gallantry award Kirti Chakra.

References

Year of birth missing
Indian police officers
Place of birth missing
Recipients of the Kirti Chakra
Kirti Chakra